Peter McCarthy is an American film producer, screenwriter, director, actor, and editor. Before practicing his craft, he taught image arts at the College of Santa Fe.

External links
 

Living people
American film editors
American film directors
American film producers
American male film actors
American male screenwriters
Place of birth missing (living people)
Year of birth missing (living people)